The Laotian Civil War was a military conflict that pitted the guerrilla forces of the Marxist-oriented Pathet Lao against the armed and security forces of the Kingdom of Laos (French: Royaume du Laos), led by the conservative Royal Lao Government, between 1960 and 1975. Main combatants comprised:

The Royal Lao Armed Forces (French: Forces Armées du Royaume), best known by its French acronym FAR, were the official armed defense forces of the Kingdom of Laos from 1959 to 1975. Subordinated to the Ministry of Defense of the Royal Lao Government at the capital Vientiane, the FAR branches were organized as follows:
 Royal Lao Army (French: Armée Royale du Laos – ARL)
 Royal Lao Air Force (French: Aviation Royale Laotiènne – AVRL)
 Royal Lao Navy (French: Marine Royale Laotiènne – MRL)
Paramilitary security forces:
 Royal Lao Police (French: Police Royale Laotiènne – PRL)
 Directorate of National Coordination (DNC) Security Agency; a.k.a. Border Police (French: Police de Frontiers), active from 1960 to 1965.

To meet the threat represented by the Pathet Lao insurgency, the Laotian Armed Forces depended on a small French military training mission (French: Mission Militaire Française près du Gouvernment Royale du Laos – MMFI-GRL), headed by a general officer, an exceptional arrangement permitted under the 1955 Geneva Accords, as well as covert assistance from the United States in the form of the Programs Evaluation Office (PEO), established on 15 December 1955, replaced in 1961 by the Military Assistance Advisory Group (Laos), which was later changed in September 1962 into the Requirements Office. Between 1962 and 1971, the U.S. provided Laos with direct military assistance, but not including the cost of equipping and training irregular and paramilitary forces by the Central Intelligence Agency (CIA). In addition to U.S. covert support, the FAR received further military assistance from the United Kingdom, Thailand, Burma, the Philippines, the Republic of China (Taiwan), South Vietnam, Indonesia, and Australia;

The Neutralist Armed Forces (French: Forces Armées Neutralistes – FAN), a dissident splinter faction of the FAR led by Captain (later, Major general) Kong Le, active from 1961 to 1966, which received support from North Vietnam, the Soviet Union, and Indonesia;
The irregular Anti-communist Special Guerrilla Units (SGU), also collectively referred to as the "Clandestine Army" or "Secret Army" (French: Armée Clandestine or Armée Secréte), recruited from Laos' ethnic minorities such as the Hmong (Meo), Yao (Iu-Mien), Mien, Lao Theung (Hune) and Lao Sung hill tribes, was led by Royal Lao Government Minister Touby Lyfoung, Major general Vang Pao and Brigadier general Thao Ty. Created from irregular ethnic auxiliary units (French: Suppletifs) raised earlier by the French during the First Indochina War, the SGUs were in reality secretly organized, trained and armed by the CIA since the late 1950s and early 1960s;

The Pathet Lao, also known as the "Lao People's Party" (1955–1972) and later the "Lao People's Revolutionary Party" (1972–present)  led by Prince Souphanouvong, and its military wing the Lao People's Armed Forces (LPAF), which was trained and armed by North Vietnam, the Soviet Union, and the People's Republic of China;

The People's Army of Vietnam (PAVN), also designated the "North Vietnamese Army" (NVA), which received support from the Soviet Union, the People's Republic of China, North Korea, East Germany, Czechoslovakia, Poland, Hungary and Bulgaria.

An eclectic variety of weapons was used by all sides in the Laotian Civil War. Laotian regular FAR and FAN and irregular SGUs weaponry in the early days of the war was a hodgepodge, with most of their combat units equipped in a haphazard way with an array of French, American, Australian, British, and German weapon systems, mostly of WWII-vintage, either drawn from First Indochina War stocks handed down by the French or secretly provided by the Americans. 
After 1955 however, the FAR began the process of standardisation on U.S. equipment, with its airborne and infantry units first taking delivery of semi-automatic and automatic small-arms of WWII/Korean War-vintage in late 1959, followed by the delivery between 1963 and 1971 of more modern military equipments, which included aircraft, armored and transport vehicles, and long-range artillery pieces. In 1969 secret deliveries of modern U.S. small-arms arrived in Laos, and were initially only given to the Laotian Royal Guard and airborne units; standardisation in U.S. fully-automatic infantry weapons in the RLA and the irregular SGUs was completed by 1971, replacing much of the older weaponry. Captured infantry weapons of Soviet and Chinese origin were also employed by elite commando or airborne units and the irregular SGUs while on special operations in the enemy-held areas of north-eastern and south-eastern Laos.

During the early phase of the war, the Pathet Lao likewise was largely equipped with WWII-vintage French, Japanese, American, British, German, Chinese, and Czechoslovakian weapons either pilfered from French colonial forces during the First Indochina War, seized from Laotian FAR units or provided by the Vietminh and subsequently by North Vietnam. As the war progressed, these obsolete weapons began to be partially superseded by more modern Eastern Bloc military hardware, including semiautomatic and fully automatic small-arms, artillery pieces, armored and transport vehicles, and aircraft of Soviet, Chinese and Hungarian origin, mostly being channelled via the North Vietnamese. Although the Pathet Lao standardized on Soviet and Chinese weapons and equipment by the early 1970s, its guerrilla forces continued to make use of captured enemy stocks until the end of the war.

Royal Lao Armed Forces, FAN and SGUs Equipment

Revolvers
Received from the US Government, used by government officials and military officers.

M1917 revolver
Smith & Wesson Model 10
Colt Cobra .38 Special snub-nose revolver

Pistols

MAS-35-S pistol (7.65mm Longue): Received from France during the First Indochina War. 
Luger P08 pistol: Received from France during the First Indochina War.
Walther P38: Received from France during the First Indochina War. 
Colt.45 M1911A1
Smith & Wesson Model 39

Submachine guns

MAS-38: Received from France during the First Indochina War.
MAT-49: Received from France during the First Indochina War.
Sterling submachine gun: Limited quantities handed down by Britain.
Owen submachine gun
Sten submachine gun: Received from France during the First Indochina War.
Carl Gustaf m/45: used by Green Berets' advisors and CIA operatives.
M1A1 Thompson 
M3/M3A1 Grease Gun: Used by the Royal Lao Police Aerial Reinforcement Unit.
PPSh-41: Captured.

Bolt-action rifles

MAS-36: Received from France during the First Indochina War.
M1903 Springfield: Limited quantities, received from France during the First Indochina War and the United States.
Lee–Enfield: Limited quantities, received from France during the First Indochina War.

Carbines

M1 Carbine: M1 & M2 models were standard issue concurrent with the M1 Garand rifle before receiving the M16.
M1A1 Carbine
M2 Carbine: Full automatic variant.
CAR-15 Assault carbine

Battle rifles

M1 Garand semi-automatic rifle
SKS semi-automatic rifle: Captured.
L1A1 SLR Assault rifle: Limited quantities handed down by Britain. 
M16A1 Assault rifle
AK-47: Captured. 
Type 56 assault rifle: Captured. 
AKM: Captured.

Light machine guns

FM 24/29: Received from France during the First Indochina War.
Bren: Received from France during the First Indochina War.
M1918A2 BAR
M1919A6 light machine gun

General-purpose machine guns

M60 
RPD: Captured.

Heavy machine guns

Browning M1919A4 .30 Cal
Browning M2HB .50 Cal 
SG-43/SGM Goryunov: Captured.
DShKM: Captured.

Grenade systems
 Alsetex grenade
 Mark 2 fragmentation hand/rifle grenade
 M26 grenade
 M59 "Baseball" hand grenade
 M61 fragmentation hand grenade 
 M67 grenade
 M18 colored smoke hand grenade
 C4 plastic explosive

Land mine systems
 M18A1 Claymore anti-personnel mine
 M14 anti-personnel blast mine
 M16 bounding anti-personnel fragmentation mine
 M15 anti-tank mine
 M19 anti-tank mine
 M24 off-route anti-tank mine: limited use by MACV–SOG teams.

Rocket systems
 2.75 inch rocket launcher

Anti-tank rockets

M20A1 3.5 inch Super Bazooka
M72 LAW
RPG-2: Captured.
RPG-7: Captured.

Grenade launchers

M79
XM-148
M203

Recoilless rifles
M18A1
M20
M67
M40A1

Mortars

M19 60mm mortar 
Brandt mle 27/31 81mm mortar: Received from France during the First Indochina War.
M29 81mm mortar 
M2 4.2 inch (107mm) mortar
M30 4.2 inch (106.7mm) mortar

Howitzers

M101A1 105mm towed field howitzer
M114A1 155mm towed field howitzer
M116 75mm towed field howitzer

Air defense guns
M1939 (61-K) 37mm: Captured.

Vehicles

M24 Chaffee Light tank
PT-76 amphibious light tank: provided to the FAN by the Soviet Union or captured.
M8 HMC 75mm self-propelled howitzer
M8 Greyhound armoured car 
M3A1 Scout Car 
M3 Half-track 
M-706 armoured car
M113 armored personnel carrier
Willys MB ¼-ton (4x4) jeep
Willys M38 MC ¼-ton (4x4) jeep
Willys M38A1 MD ¼-ton (4x4) jeep
Jeepster Commando (4x4) hardtop Sport utility vehicle (SUV)
M151 ¼-ton (4x4) utility truck
Dodge WC-51/52 ¾-ton (4x4) utility truck
Dodge M37 ¾-ton (4x4) 1953 utility truck 
Chevrolet G506 1½-ton (4x4) cargo truck
GMC CCKW 2½-ton (6x6) cargo truck
M35A1 2½-ton (6x6) cargo truck
M809 5-ton (6x6) cargo truck

Helicopters
UH-1C Huey gunship
UH-1D/H transport
Mil Mi-4 transport: provided to the FAN by the Soviet Union.
Sikorsky H-19 transport
Sikorsky H-34D transport
Sud Aviation SA 3130 Alouette II light helicopter
Sud Aviation SA 316B Alouette III light helicopter

Aircraft

Cessna T-41B/D Mescalero trainer
North American T-6G Texan trainer/fighter-bomber
North American RT-28B Trojan trainer
North American T-28D Trojan fighter-bomber
AC-47D Spooky gunship
U-6 (L-20) STOL utility transport
De Havilland DH.104 Dove short-haul airliner 
Aero Commander 560 utility transport
Antonov An-2 utility aircraft: provided to the FAN by the Soviet Union.
Douglas C-47D Skytrain transport
Lisunov Li-2 utility transport: provided to the FAN by the Soviet Union.
Curtiss C-46F Commando transport
Fairchild C-123K Provider transport
Morane-Saulnier MS 500 Criquet liaison aircraft
U-17A/B light utility aircraft 
Cessna L-19A/O-1F Bird Dog reconnaissance/observation light aircraft
EC-47D SIGINT aircraft

River craft
 Cabin-type patrol boat
 Chris-Craft patrol boat
 11m patrol boat
 PBR, Patrol Boat River (all fiberglass boats, propelled by twin water jets)
 LCM-8 Landing Craft Utility (LCU)

Pathet Lao forces Equipment

Pistols
Tokarev TT-33
Type 54 pistol: Chinese copy of TT-33.
Colt.45 M1911A1: Captured.

Submachine guns
MAS-38: Captured.
MAT-49: Captured.
PPSh-41 
PPS-43
K-50M

Carbines
M1 Carbine: all variants captured. 
M1A1 Carbine
M2 Carbine

Bolt-action rifles
Mosin–Nagant: Received from the Soviet Union and North Vietnam.
Type 53 Carbine: Received from China and North Vietnam.
MAS-36: Captured.
Arisaka: Limited quantities handed down from North Vietnam.
US M1917: Captured from the French during the First Indochina War or received from the Viet Minh.
Mauser Kar98k: Mauser rifles received from China and the Soviet Union handed down by North Vietnam.

Sniper rifles

M/52

Battle rifles 
SKS semi-automatic rifle
Type 56 Carbine Chinese copy of the SKS.
vz. 52 rifle
AK-47
AKM
Type 56 assault rifle Chinese variant of the AK-47.
Type 56-1
M1 Garand semi-automatic rifle: Captured.
M16A1 Assault rifle: Captured.

Light machine guns

Degtyaryov DP/DPM
Type 53 Chinese copy of the Degtyaryov DP/DPM.
RPK
Type 26 Chinese copy of the ZB vz. 26.
Bren: Captured.
FM 24/29: Captured.
M1918A2 BAR: Captured.

General-purpose machine guns
Degtyaryov RP-46
RPD
Type 56 machine gun Chinese copy of the RPD.
PK/PKM

Heavy machine guns

SG-43/SGM Goryunov 
Type 53/57 Chinese variant of SG-43 and SGM.
DShKM
Type 54 Chinese variant of DShKM.
KPV
Browning M1919A4: Captured.

Grenade systems
F1/M33 hand grenade
RG-4 anti-personnel grenade
RG-42 hand grenade
RGD-5 hand grenade
RPG-43 anti-tank grenade
Type 1/M33 hand grenade
Type 42 hand grenade
Type 59 hand grenade
Type 67 stick granade

Land mine systems
POMZ-2 anti-personnel mine
Type 2M anti-personnel mine
PMD-6/7 anti-personnel mine
PP-Mi-Sr anti-personnel mine
TMD-B anti-personnel mine
TM-41 anti-tank mine
TMB-2 anti-tank mine
TM-46/TMN-46 anti-tank mine

Anti-tank rocket launchers

RPG-2: B40 Rocket
RPG-7: B41 Rocket
Type 56 RPG
Type 69 RPG

Grenade launchers
M79: Captured.

Recoilless rifles

B-10
B-11
Type 56
Type 65

Mortars
Brandt mle 27/31 81mm mortar: Captured.
Type 53 82mm mortar
PM-41 82mm mortar
M1938 107mm mortar
Type 55 120mm mortar

Howitzers

M-30 122mm howitzer (M1938)

Air defense guns
 
 
ZU-23-2 23mm autocannon.
ZPU-4 14.5mm Quadruple AA autocannon.
M1939 (61-K) 37mm
AZP S-60 57mm

Vehicles

PT-76 amphibious light tank
T-34/85 medium tank 
Type 62 light tank
T-54/55 main battle tank
BRDM-2 Amphibious Armoured Scout Car
BTR-40 armored personnel carrier
BTR-152 armored personnel carrier
BJ-212 (4x4) light Utility Vehicle
GAZ-69A (4x4) light truck
GAZ-63 (4x4) 2-ton truck
ZIL-130 medium-weight general-purpose truck
ZIS-151 2½-ton (6x6) general-purpose truck
ZIL-157 2½-ton (6x6) general-purpose truck
M35A1 2½-ton (6x6) cargo truck: Captured.

Helicopters
Mil Mi-4 transport

Aircraft
Polikarpov Po-2 utility biplane/trainer
Antonov An-2 utility aircraft
Lisunov Li-2 utility transport
Ilyushin Il-12 transport

River craft
 River Sampan

See also
 Cambodian Civil War
 First Indochina War
 Laotian Civil War
 Vietnam War
 Weapons of the Vietnam War
 Weapons of the Cambodian Civil War
 Weapons of the First Indochina War

Notes

References

Albert Grandolini, Armor of the Vietnam War (2): Asian Forces, Concord Publications, Hong Kong 1998. 
Bernard C. Nalty, Jacob Neufeld and George M. Watson, An Illustrated Guide to the Air War over Vietnam, Salamander Books Ltd, London 1982. 
Bernie Fitzsimons, The Defenders: A Comprehensive Guide to Warplanes of the USA, Aerospace Publishing, London 1988. 
Bill Gunston, An Illustrated Guide to Military Helicopters, Salamander Books Ltd, London 1981. 
Christopher F. Foss, Jane's Tank & Combat Vehicle recognition guide, HarperCollins Publishers, London 2002.  
Gordon L. Rottman and Hugh Johnson, Vietnam Riverine Craft 1962-75, New Vanguard series 128, Osprey Publishing Ltd, Oxford 2006. 
Gordon L. Rottman, The Bazooka, Weapon series 18, Osprey Publishing Ltd, Oxford 2012. 
Ian Hogg, Jane's Guns recognition guide, HarperCollins Publishers, London 2002. 
James Kinnear, Stephen Sewell & Andrey Aksenov, Soviet T-54 Main Battle Tank, General Military series, Osprey Publishing Ltd, Oxford 2018. 
James Kinnear, Stephen Sewell & Andrey Aksenov, Soviet T-55 Main Battle Tank, General Military series, Osprey Publishing Ltd, Oxford 2019. 
Jan Churchill, Hit My Smoke: Forward Air Controllers in Southeast Asia, Sunflower University Press, Manhattan KS, 1997. 
John Andrade, Militair 1982, Aviation Press Limited, London 1982. 
John J.H. Taylor and Kenneth Munson, Jane's Pocket Book of Major Combat Aircraft, Collier Books, New York 1973. 
John Walter, Walther Pistols – PP, PPK and P 38, Weapon series 82, Osprey Publishing Ltd, Oxford 2022. 
Joseph D. Celeski, Special Air Warfare and the Secret War in Laos: Air Commandos 1964–1975, Air University Press, Maxwell AFB, Alabama 2019. –   
Kenneth Conboy and Simon McCouaig, The War in Laos 1960-75, Men-at-arms series 217, Osprey Publishing Ltd, London 1989. 
Kenneth Conboy and Don Greer, War in Laos, 1954-1975, Carrollton, TX: Squadron/Signal Publications, 1994. 
Kenneth Conboy, Kenneth Bowra, and Simon McCouaig, The NVA and Viet Cong, Elite series 38, Osprey Publishing Ltd, Oxford 1992. 
Kenneth Conboy with James Morrison, Shadow War: The CIA's Secret War in Laos, Boulder CO: Paladin Press, 1995. 
Maj. Gen. Oudone Sananikone, The Royal Lao Army and U.S. Army advice and support, Indochina monographs series, United States Army Center of Military History, Washington D.C. 1981. – 
Nikolaus Krivinyi, World Military Aviation, Arco Publishing Company, New York 1977. 
Peter E. Davies, UH-1 Huey Gunship vs NVA/VC Forces: Vietnam 1962–75, Duel series 112, Osprey Publishing Ltd, Oxford 2021.  
Larry Davis and Don Greer, Gunships, A Pictorial History of Spooky – Specials series (6032), Carrollton, TX: Squadron/Signal Publications, 1982. 
Leroy Thompson, The M1 Carbine, Weapon series 13, Osprey Publishing Ltd, Oxford 2011. 
Michael Green & Peter Sarson, Armor of the Vietnam War (1): Allied Forces, Concord Publications, Hong Kong 1996. 
Richard Lathrop, John McDonald and Jim Laurier, Cadillac Cage V-100 Commando 1960-71, New Vanguard series 52, Osprey Publishing Ltd, Oxford 2002. 
Steven J. Zaloga and Jim Laurier, M24 Chaffee Light Tank 1943–85, New Vanguard series 77, Osprey Publishing Ltd, Oxford 2003. 
 Thomas Ahern, Undercover Armies: CIA and Surrogate Warfare in Laos, Center for the Study of Intelligence, Washington D.C. 2006. Classified control no. C05303949.
 Timothy Castle, At War in the Shadow of Vietnam: United States Military Aid to the Royal Lao Government, 1955–1975, Columbia University Press, 1993.

External links
Country Study - Kingdom of Laos
http://www.warboats.org/vietnamboats.htm

Laotian Civil War
Vietnam War-related lists
Laotian military-related lists
Laotian Civil War